The John Frost House is a property in Brentwood, Tennessee, United States, that was listed on the National Register of Historic Places in 1988.  It has also been known as Cottonport, and dates from c.1810.

The NRHP-eligibility of the property was covered in a 1988 study of Williamson County historical resources.

It is a two-story central passage plan house upon a limestone foundation, with a two-story portico with square posts and balustrade that was added in c.1980.  It is built of five course common bond brick.  A second contributing building on the property is a c.1830 single pen log outbuilding with half-dovetail notching.

References

Central-passage houses in Tennessee
Houses completed in 1810
Houses in Williamson County, Tennessee
Houses on the National Register of Historic Places in Tennessee
National Register of Historic Places in Williamson County, Tennessee